Reading North was a borough constituency represented in the House of Commons of the Parliament of the United Kingdom. It elected one Member of Parliament (MP) by the first past the post system of election. The constituency covered an area in and around the town of Reading in the county of Berkshire.

History 
The Reading North parliamentary constituency was first created for the 1950 general election by splitting the previous parliamentary constituency of Reading into North and South divisions. These constituencies were merged back into a single Reading constituency in for the 1955 general election.

The Reading North constituency was recreated in 1974, when it was contested and won for the Conservative Party by Tony Durant. In 1983 the constituencies in Reading were reorganised, creating the new constituencies of Reading East and Reading West. Tony Durant went on to hold the Reading West constituency until 1997.

In both its incarnations, the constituency included Reading town centre.

Boundaries
1950–1955: The County Borough of Reading wards of Abbey, Battle, Castle, Caversham East, Caversham West, Tilehurst, and Victoria.

It was then abolished and absorbed into the re-established Borough Constituency of Reading, with the exception of the Tilehurst ward, which was transferred to Newbury.

1974–1983: The County Borough of Reading wards of Abbey, Battle, Castle, Caversham, Katesgrove, Minster, Norcot, Thames, and Tilehurst.

The Tilehurst and Norcot wards were transferred back from Newbury; the remaining wards were previously part of the abolished Borough Constituency of Reading.

The constituency was abolished for the 1983 general election, with the majority forming the basis of the new County Constituency of Reading West, whilst northern areas, including Caversham, formed part of the new County Constituency of Reading East.

Members of Parliament

MPs 1950–1955

MPs 1974–1983

Elections

Elections in the 1950s

Elections in the 1970s

See also
 List of parliamentary constituencies in Berkshire

References 

 
 

Politics of Reading, Berkshire
Parliamentary constituencies in Berkshire (historic)
Constituencies of the Parliament of the United Kingdom established in 1950
Constituencies of the Parliament of the United Kingdom disestablished in 1955
Constituencies of the Parliament of the United Kingdom established in 1974
Constituencies of the Parliament of the United Kingdom disestablished in 1983